James Patrick Conway (10 August 1946 – 14 February 2020) was an Irish international association footballer who played professionally in Ireland, England and the United States. He earned 20 caps for the Republic of Ireland national football team, playing mainly as a midfielder, and coached extensively at the professional and collegiate levels in the United States.

Player

Professional
Born in Dublin, Conway began his career with Stella Maris. From there he moved to Bohemians in 1964 as a senior in his home city. In 1966, he moved to Fulham. A midfielder or winger, he spent ten years at Craven Cottage, scoring 67 times in 314 League games before a £30,000 fee brought him north to join Manchester City in August 1976. He was a member of the Fulham side that reached the 1975 FA Cup Final. He played with his brother John at Fulham and his brother Tom also played professionally. Having played just 13 times for City, scoring the winning goal in the final game of the season against Coventry City when Manchester City came second to Liverpool in 1977, he moved to the Portland Timbers of the North American Soccer League for £10,000 on 17 January 1978. He spent three seasons with the Timbers.

International
At the international level, Conway earned 20 caps for the Republic of Ireland.

Manager
In 1980, Conway became a player-coach with the Portland Timbers. In 1982, he became the head coach of the Pacific University men's team. In 1988, he became the first collegiate head men's soccer coach in Oregon State University history. He coached the Beavers from 1988 to 1996, and compiled a 97-89-13 record at the helm. In November 2000, he became an assistant coach with the Portland Timbers of the USL First Division.

His son, Paul also had a professional career.

References

External links
 
 Portland Timbers stats
 Portland Tribune: Lots of love for Jimmy Conway
 Oregonian: "Portland Timbers teammates for life: With Mick Hoban by his side, Jimmy Conway doesn't walk alone in battle against dementia"

1946 births
2020 deaths
Bohemian F.C. players
Fulham F.C. players
Manchester City F.C. players
League of Ireland players
North American Soccer League (1968–1984) indoor players
North American Soccer League (1968–1984) players
Oregon State Beavers men's soccer coaches
Association footballers from Dublin (city)
Portland Timbers (1975–1982) players
Republic of Ireland association footballers
Republic of Ireland international footballers
League of Ireland XI players
English Football League players
Expatriate footballers in England
Irish expatriate sportspeople in the United States
Republic of Ireland expatriate association footballers
Expatriate soccer players in the United States
Association football midfielders
Expatriate soccer managers in the United States
Stella Maris F.C. players
Republic of Ireland football managers
FA Cup Final players
Irish expatriate sportspeople in England